Guillano Édouard (born 19 January 1979) is a Mauritian international footballer who plays as a defender. As of May 2011, he has won 27 caps for the Mauritius national football team.

References

1979 births
Living people
Mauritian footballers
Mauritius international footballers
Mauritian Premier League players
AS Port-Louis 2000 players
Association football defenders